Saffron rice is a dish made from saffron, white rice and also usually vegetable bouillon. Saffron rice is found in the cuisines of many countries (in one form or another). The recipe is similar to plain cooked rice with addition of ingredients.

Variations 
Saffron rice is a dish in the cuisine of Seychelles.

South Asia 
In Bangladesh, Pakistan and India, plain saffron rice is cooked with joha rice or basmati rice, saffron, vegetable bouillon, ghee, and bay leaves.

Middle East 
In Iran and Turkey, sweet saffron rice called Sholezard and Zerde is made from white rice, saffron, table sugar, rose water, roasted pine seeds, and chopped pistachio nuts.

Other, similar dishes exist in other parts of Western Asia.

See also

 List of rice dishes

References

External links
 

Pakistani rice dishes
Indian rice dishes
Rice dishes
Turkish desserts
Iranian cuisine
Spanish cuisine